SS Robert Battey was a Liberty ship built in the United States during World War II. She was named after Robert Battey, a Confederate States Army surgeon and later a civilian gynecologist.

Construction
Robert Battey was laid down on 8 October 1943, under a Maritime Commission (MARCOM) contract, MC hull 1506, by J.A. Jones Construction, Brunswick, Georgia; sponsored by Mrs. Edwin L. Jones, daughter-in-law of J.A Jones secretary treasurer, Edwin L. Jones, and launched on 30 November 1943.

History
She was allocated to the Cosmopolitan Shipping Co., on 10 December 1943. On or about 6 September 1945, she ran aground near Mindanao, Philippines, and was declared a constructive total loss (CTL). She was refloated and later laid up in the National Defense Reserve Fleet in Subic Bay, on 4 January 1946. On 17 December 1946, she was laid up in the National Defense Reserve Fleet in Suisun Bay, California. It was estimated that it would cost $150,000 to make Robert Battey seaworthy again but there are no records stating that the work was done. On 16 December 1964, the US Navy requested her for use as a target ship. On 11 February 1965, she was withdrawn from the reserve fleet and turned over to the Navy where she was presumably sunk.

References

Bibliography

 
 
 
 
 

 

Liberty ships
Ships built in Brunswick, Georgia
1943 ships
Subic Bay Reserve Fleet
Suisun Bay Reserve Fleet
Maritime incidents in September 1945